The Flyers–Penguins rivalry, also known as the Battle of Pennsylvania, is a National Hockey League (NHL) rivalry between the Philadelphia Flyers and Pittsburgh Penguins ice hockey clubs. Both teams compete in the NHL's Eastern Conference Metropolitan Division. The rivalry began in 1967, when the teams were introduced into the NHL's "Next Six" expansion wave. The rivalry exists due to divisional alignment and geographic location, as both teams play in the Commonwealth of Pennsylvania. The Flyers and Penguins met in the Stanley Cup playoffs four times in 11 years from 2008 to 2018, strengthening the rivalry.

Early days
The first meeting between the Flyers and Penguins occurred on October 19, 1967, in the first-ever game at the Philadelphia Spectrum. Flyers goaltender Doug Favell stopped all 17 Pittsburgh shots and Bill Sutherland scored the lone goal 2:59 into the third period for a 1–0 Flyers win.

When the NHL realigned divisions prior to the  season, the two Pennsylvania teams were moved to separate divisions.

Most notably during this era was the Penguins' 42-game winless streak at the Spectrum; from February 7, 1974, through February 2, 1989, the Penguins were 0–39–3 at the Spectrum.  From 1967 to 1989, Philadelphia went 86–36–19 against Pittsburgh.

Arrival of Mario Lemieux
After years of underperformance, the arrival of Mario Lemieux in Pittsburgh gave the Penguins respectability in the NHL. In , the Flyers and the Penguins met for the first time in the playoffs in the Patrick Division Finals. 

The series proved to be a turning point for both franchises. The Flyers missed the playoffs for the next five seasons, while the Penguins became an annual contender with such stars as Lemieux, Jaromir Jagr, Ron Francis, and Larry Murphy.

Eric Lindros and the 1990s
The rivalry continued during the 1990s with the arrival of Eric Lindros in Philadelphia, which gave the Flyers a counterbalance against Lemieux. During that same season, the Flyers won the Eastern Conference's crown by one point in the standings, despite Pittsburgh having 49 wins to Philadelphia's 45. The two teams met again in the playoffs, in the 1997 Eastern Conference Quarterfinals. The Flyers won in five games, and Lemieux subsequently retired for the first time at the end of the series. After Game 5, Lemieux skated around the ice and received a standing ovation from the Philadelphia crowd. He had previously received a standing ovation from the Philadelphia crowd in March 1993 after returning from radiation treatments.

One of the most memorable moments of the rivalry occurred during the  season, when the two teams met in the Eastern Conference Semifinals. A season after the Penguins joined the Atlantic Division, the Flyers had won the Division and the #1 seed in the East, while the Penguins made the playoffs as the seventh seed. Despite this, the Penguins jumped out to a 2–0 series lead, winning both games in Philadelphia. The Flyers won Game 3 in overtime, but NHL history was made in Game 4. Tied at 1–1, the game stretched to five overtime periods and set the record for the longest game played in the modern era of the NHL. Keith Primeau's goal at the 92:01 mark of overtime (152:01 overall) gave the Flyers a 2–1 win and a 2–2 split in the series. The outcome energized the Flyers and demoralized the Penguins, as the Flyers won the next two games and the series.

Rivalry in the 21st century
The rivalry between the two teams lost its luster in the years leading up to the 2004–05 NHL lockout, as the Penguins struggled on-and-off the ice, dropping to the bottom of not only the League standings, but the attendance rankings as well.

In , the Penguins defeated the Flyers in all eight matchups between the two teams, and Penguins goaltender Marc-Andre Fleury became the first goaltender to defeat a team eight times in a season since . The Flyers have swept the season series three times, winning all four games during the  season, all seven games during the  season, and all four games during the  season. During the  season, the Flyers won five games and the Penguins won three in the season series. The series was highlighted by an 8–2 win by the Flyers and a 7–1 win by the Penguins. The Penguins and the Flyers faced off in the 2008 Eastern Conference Finals, won by the Penguins in five games for the Penguins' first-ever playoff series win against the Flyers. A year later, in the 2009 Eastern Conference Quarterfinals, the Penguins beat the Flyers again, winning the series 4–2 on their way to winning the Stanley Cup.

In the  season opener, Philadelphia traveled to Pittsburgh to open the Penguins new arena, the Consol Energy Center, on October 7. Rookie goaltender Sergei Bobrovsky made his NHL debut, leading the Flyers to a 3–2 victory. Flyers forward Danny Briere scored the first NHL goal in the new building, and Penguins forward Tyler Kennedy scored the first Penguins goal.

On July 1, 2011, the Flyers signed former Penguins Jaromir Jagr and Maxime Talbot to a one-year, $3.3 million deal and a five-year, $9 million deal, respectively.

The rivalry between the two teams briefly became an alliance late in 2011, when Commissioner Gary Bettman and the NHL began discussions for league realignment from six divisions to four. One proposal would have resulted in separating the Penguins and Flyers into different divisions and lowering their in-season matchups from six to two. Members of both organizations actively spoke against breaking up the two teams, citing the importance of the rivalry to the teams, the fans, as well as the state of Pennsylvania. When the re-aligned conferences were unveiled later that year, both teams were placed in the eventually-named Metropolitan Division, ensuring the rivalry's continuation.

On April 1, 2012, the Flyers and Penguins were involved in a late-game skirmish at Consol Energy Center. The game, which the Flyers won 6–4, was highlighted by Flyers Head Coach Peter Laviolette and Penguins Assistant Coach Tony Granato standing atop the boards and engaged in a verbal altercation. Both were eventually fined by the NHL. On April 7, the Penguins defeated the Flyers for the first time in six games at Consol Energy Center, winning 4–2. As of the 2015–16 season, the Flyers hold a 13–3-1 record against the Penguins at Consol Energy Center.

The teams met again in the 2012 Eastern Conference Quarterfinals, their third meeting in five seasons. The Flyers won the series in 6 games, surprising the hockey world, as the Penguins were heavily favored to win the Stanley Cup that year. The teams combined for an NHL-record 45 goals in the first four games, as well as combining for 309 penalty minutes (158 of which were in Philadelphia's 8–4 Game 3 victory, which put them ahead 3–0 in the series) throughout the fight-filled, six-game series.

The rivalry once again received significant attention by the end of the 2010s with two NHL Stadium Series matches between the two teams in 2017 and 2019 to celebrate both teams' 50th anniversaries, plus another playoff series between the two teams during the 2018 Eastern Conference First Round. In the 2017 NHL Stadium Series, set at Pittsburgh's Heinz Field, the Penguins defeated the Flyers 4–2.  In the 2019 NHL Stadium Series, set at Philadelphia's Lincoln Financial Field, the Flyers bested the Penguins in a 4–3 overtime victory, rallying from a seemingly insurmountable 3–1 deficit in the final frame with two extra attacker goals.

Between these two outdoor matches, the Penguins also defeated the Flyers in their 2018 playoff clash, four games to two, following a season sweep courtesy of Pittsburgh. The first four games of the series were all lopsided, including a 7–0 win by Pittsburgh in Game 1, a 5–1 win by Philadelphia in Game 2, a 5–1 win by Pittsburgh in Game 3, and a 5–0 win by Pittsburgh in Game 4. The next 2 games were much closer. Game 5 saw a 4–2 Philadelphia win, with Sean Couturier scoring the game-winning goal with just over a minute left in regulation. The Penguins clinched the series with an 8–5 win in Game 6 at Philadelphia. Jake Guentzel tallied 4 goals in the game for the Penguins, while Sean Couturier tallied 3 goals and 2 assists. The series saw 43 total goals.

Cultural impact
The rivalry is frequently regarded as the most intense in the league. The rivalry has been referred to as "The Keystone State Rivalry" and "The Pennsylvania Cold War", references to the Commonwealth of Pennsylvania's nickname. Both teams have very loyal fan bases that essentially divide the Commonwealth's loyalty in half; the eastern half of the state consists of mostly Flyer fans, while the western half consists of mostly Penguin fans. Both teams regularly sellout their arenas, Wells Fargo Center and PPG Paints Arena, respectively. At most games, derogatory chants will sound towards the opposition. Flyers fans often chant "Crosby sucks" towards Penguins captain Sidney Crosby, as well as booing whenever he touches the puck. Their antics reached a new high, as during Game 3 of the 2018 playoffs, pictures of Crosby appeared in the urinals inside of Wells Fargo Center. On the other side, Penguins fans tend to simply chant, "Flyers suck", rather than singling out specific players. Several fights have broken out between fans, the most recent coming after the 2012 playoffs.

The rivalry is a hot ticket in both cities; it is often the most anticipated match-up of the season. The rivalry is such that former Penguin Ryan Malone, who grew up in Pittsburgh due to his dad Greg Malone having also played for the Penguins, told his agent not to field any free agent offers from the Flyers.

See also
National Hockey League rivalries
Phillies–Pirates rivalry
Eagles–Steelers rivalry

Notes

References

National Hockey League rivalries
History of the Philadelphia Flyers
Pittsburgh Penguins
1967 establishments in Pennsylvania
Ice hockey in Pennsylvania
Philadelphia Flyers